Kim Hyun-sub (or  ; born May 31, 1985) is a male race walker from South Korea. He is the first South Korean person who obtained a medal at IAAF World Athletics Championships.

Competition record

References

External links
 

1985 births
Living people
South Korean male racewalkers
Athletes (track and field) at the 2008 Summer Olympics
Athletes (track and field) at the 2012 Summer Olympics
Athletes (track and field) at the 2016 Summer Olympics
Olympic athletes of South Korea
Asian Games medalists in athletics (track and field)
Athletes (track and field) at the 2006 Asian Games
Athletes (track and field) at the 2010 Asian Games
Athletes (track and field) at the 2014 Asian Games
Athletes (track and field) at the 2018 Asian Games
World Athletics Championships athletes for South Korea
Universiade medalists in athletics (track and field)
Asian Games silver medalists for South Korea
Asian Games bronze medalists for South Korea
Medalists at the 2006 Asian Games
Medalists at the 2010 Asian Games
Medalists at the 2014 Asian Games
Universiade silver medalists for South Korea
People from Sokcho
Sportspeople from Gangwon Province, South Korea
21st-century South Korean people